Myzocytosis (from Greek: myzein, meaning "to suck" and kytos meaning "container", hence referring to "cell") is a method of feeding found in some heterotrophic organisms. It is also called "cellular vampirism" as the predatory cell pierces the cell wall and/or cell membrane of the prey cell with a feeding tube, the conoid, sucks out the cellular content and digests it.

Myzocytosis is found in Myzozoa and also in some species of Ciliophora (both comprise the alveolates). A classic example of myzocytosis is the feeding method of the infamous predatory ciliate, Didinium, where it is often depicted devouring a hapless Paramecium.  The suctorian ciliates were originally thought to have fed exclusively through myzocytosis, sucking out the cytoplasm of prey via superficially drinking straw-like pseudopodia.  It is now understood that suctorians do not feed through myzocytosis, but actually, instead, manipulate and envenomate captured prey with their tentacle-like pseudopodia.

References

Further reading
 (2010) Endosymbiotic associations within protists Phil. Trans. R. Soc. B 12 March 2010 vol. 365 no. 1541 699-712

Alveolate biology
Ecology
Metabolism